Jorge Fernando "Locomotora" Castro (born August 18, 1967) is an Argentine boxer and former middleweight champion of the world, who is best known for his second defense of the title against John David Jackson in 1994.

Early years
Castro, who in 1985 was set to become a professional boxer but suffered a bicycle accident that left him injured so badly that doctors told him he'd never be able to fight as a professional, recuperated from the accident and turned professional, defying the doctor's predictions, in 1987.

Professional career
In December 1991, at Palais Omnisports, Bercy, France, Castro lost to Terry Norris by a wide unanimous decision in a challenge for the WBC super welterweight title. It was reported that prior to the bout, Castro had done roadwork for the first time in his life.

In June 1992, at the Civic Center in Pensacola, Florida, United States, Castro lost a wide decision over ten rounds to future pound for pound king Roy Jones Jr.

Castro became a world champion in 1994 by defeating Reggie Johnson in Buenos Aires by split decision to win the vacant WBA middleweight title. After defeating Alex Ramos by a knockout in two rounds to retain the belt, he travelled to Monterrey, Mexico, to defend against the former undefeated holder of the WBA title John David Jackson in December 1994.

What began merely as an undercard world title fight in a pay-per-view program featuring Félix Trinidad vs Oba Carr and Julio César Chávez vs Tony Lopez, soon became a fight that is part of boxing's lore. Castro was trailing badly on all three scorecards, with one eye closed and the other one only halfway opened, bleeding and taking combination after combination against the ropes. Seemingly on the verge of being stopped, Castro landed a left hook to Jackson's chin and Jackson hit the floor. Jackson got up, but he suffered two more knockdowns and Castro completed what could be said that was one of the greatest turnarounds ever in a boxing fight, retaining the title by a knockout in the ninth round.

At the press conference after the fight, Castro called his winning punch La mano de Dios, (The hand of God), in reference to the Hand of God goal by Diego Maradona during a win by Argentina national football team at the 1986 FIFA World Cup, which, like the fight, had taken place in Mexico. Therefore, that moment became known as boxing's version of The hand of God. The fight, and its ending, were talked about for months on many boxing magazines and books.

Castro defended his title another two times, including a rematch win over Reggie Johnson, and then he lost the title to Shinji Takehara by a decision in twelve. He split two 10-round decisions with Roberto Durán, winning the first in Argentina, but losing the rematch in Panama, and then he gave Jackson a rematch, this time winning by a decision in ten.

Castro has lost two more world championship fights: in December 2000, he went to Germany and lost by a knockout in 10 to WBC cruiserweight champion Juan Carlos Gómez, and in February 2002, he went to Phoenix and challenged IBF cruiserweight champion Vassiliy Jirov, a Kazakhstan native who lives in Phoenix, losing by a decision in twelve. Despite his failures in these attempts to become a world champion again, he did not announce a retirement until 2013.

On June 18, 2005, Jorge Castro suffered a car accident in Buenos Aires, with a collapsed lung and some broken ribs. The accident and its consequences were similar to the one suffered by archrival Duran in Buenos Aires a few years before. Castro required hospitalization and emergency surgery, and was in stable condition after the surgery. He recuperated from his injuries.

On April 22, 2006, Castro fought Jose Luis Herrera, losing by a fourth-round knockout. He had his "revenge" against the same opponent on January 27, 2007, when Castro won by technical K.O. in the second round.

Currently, he has a record of 130 wins, 11 losses and 3 draws, with 89 knockout wins, which ranks him among the most prolific knockout winners in boxing history according to the records of Ring Magazine.

Professional boxing record

Trivia
He is known to be a good autograph signer.
In Argentina, he is also known as el Roña (Spanish for 'the dirt').
On May 13, 2007, Locomotora Castro joined the reality TV show Gran Hermano Famosos (Big Brother), along with 13 other celebrities from Argentina. The show was aired on Telefe Channel. Castro was the 8th eliminated, after staying in the house 58 days.
 He was a contestant in Bailando 2011, but he and her partner, Sofía Macaggi, were the 2nd couple eliminated.

References

External links
 

|-

|}

1967 births
Living people
People from Santa Cruz Province, Argentina
Gran Hermano (Argentine TV series) contestants
World Boxing Association champions
Argentine male boxers
Middleweight boxers
Bailando por un Sueño (Argentine TV series) participants